Newport Township may refer to:

Newport Township, Quebec, Canada
Newport Township, Lake County, Illinois
Newport Township, Johnson County, Iowa
Newport Township, Barton County, Missouri
Newport Township, Carteret County, North Carolina, in Carteret County, North Carolina
Newport Township, McHenry County, North Dakota, in McHenry County, North Dakota
Newport Township, Washington County, Ohio
Newport Township, Luzerne County, Pennsylvania
Newport Township, Marshall County, South Dakota, in Marshall County, South Dakota

Township name disambiguation pages